Paramesotriton longliensis is a species of salamander in the family Salamandridae from southern China. Its type locality is Shuichang (水场乡), Longli County, Guizhou. Specimens from southeastern Chongqing may also belong to this species.

References

longliensis